St Michael's Abbey in Antwerp was a Premonstratensian abbey founded in 1124 by Norbert of Xanten and laid waste during the French Revolutionary Wars. In 1807 a semaphore station was installed in the tower of the church. The buildings were demolished in 1831.

The abbey has been described as "one of the key churches and most significant monuments in Antwerp from its foundation in the 12th century to its destruction in the nineteenth."

History
Until 1124 a collegiate church dedicated to Saint Michael and served by 12 secular canons was the only parish church in Antwerp. In 1124 the chapter was reformed by St Norbert as a Premonstratensian abbey. The abbey buildings stood between what are now the streets Kloosterstraat and Sint-Michielskaai, and Sint-Jansvliet in the north and the Scheldestraat (Kronenbrugstraat) in the south.

The abbey obtained large tracts of land in and around Antwerp, such as the lordships of Kiel and Beerschot, the land of Haringrode and Zurenborg, and as late as 1674 Berendrecht and Zandvliet, which helped shape the ultimate territory of Antwerp.

The abbey was partly destroyed by the French army during the War of the First Coalition in 1796. Many of the buildings were demolished to create military barracks and a naval arsenal with shipyards and slipways. In 1807 the tower of the abbey church was equipped with a semaphore. In 1831 the French barracks were bombarded by the Dutch garrison Commander David Hendrik Chassé, whose troops were holding the Citadel of Antwerp.

Art

Isabella of Bourbon (1436-1465), second wife of Charles the Bold, Duke of Burgundy, and the mother of Mary of Burgundy, heiress of Burgundy, died in the abbey in 1465 and was buried in the abbey church. In 1476 a monumental tomb was erected in her memory. It was decorated with 24 bronze statuettes of pleurants standing in niches, known as 'weepers' or 'mourners', with a bronze effigy of Isabella herself surmounted on it. The remnants of the pleurants are now kept in the Rijksmuseum (Amsterdam) and in M - Museum Leuven. The rest of the tomb, with the statue of Isabella, is now in Antwerp Cathedral. Nothing more of the tomb furnishings survives.

In the 17th century the monastery was well known as a patron of the arts, commissioning works from major Antwerp painters such as Peter Paul Rubens, Anthony van Dyck and Jacob Jordaens. Around 1624 Rubens delivered a monumental altarpiece for the abbey church, The Adoration of the Magi. It was stolen during the French occupation and after 1815 was returned to the Royal Museum of Fine Arts (Antwerp).

The floor with many tombstones was transferred to the Cathedral of Our Lady, that had lost its floor during the French occupation.

The 18th century communion bench and the confessional are now in the Church of St Gertrude in Bergen op Zoom (Netherlands).

Abbots
List to 1709 from Jean François Foppens, Historia episcopatus Antverpiensis (Joannes Franciscus Broncart, Liège, 1717), pp. 147-150.

Waltmannus, 1124–1138
Emelinus, died 1161
Alardus, died 1162
Thibaldus, resigned 1171
Richardus, resigned 1188
Waltherus de Stripe, died 1192
Elias, died 1199
Giselbertus, died 1205
Hugo, died 1208
Arnoldus de Erps, translated 1219
Hermannus, died 1230
Sigerius, died 1230
Eggerius, died 1244
Gerardus de Lira, died 1258
Joannes de Lira, died 1272
Aegidius de Biervliet, died 1286
Henricus de Mechlinia, died 1300
Godefridus de Waerloos, died 1328
Guilielmus de Cabeliau, died 1341
Guilielmus Lympiaes, died 1353
Martinus Loys, died 1372
Guilielmus Brulocht, died 1390
Petrus Breem, died 1413
Arnoldus (c. 1415)
Olardus Terlinck, died 1452
Joannes Fierkens, died 1476
Andreas Aechtenryt, died 1478
Joannes Robyns, died 1486
Joannes de Weerdt, died 1499 : Post Tenebra espere Lucem.
Jacobus Elsacker, died 1505
Jacobus Embrechts, died 1514
Stephanus a Thenis, died 1518
Cornelis de Mera, died 1538
Gregorius de Dagis, died 1562
Cornelius Emerici, died 1563
Guilielmus de Greve, died 1581
Emericus Andreae, died 1590
Dionysius Feyten, died 1612
Christianus Michaelius, died 1614
Matthæus Yrsselius, died 1629
Johannes Chrysostomus vander Sterre, died 1652: Luce et ardens.
Norbert van Couwerven, died 1661: Vince.
Macarius Simeomo, STL, died 1676: Vigila.
Hermannus vander Poorten, died 1680: Virtus acressit in Umbra.
Gerardus Knyff, died 1686: Ad astra per Arghem.
Joannes Chrysostomus Teniers, died 1709: Tene Quod Bene.
John Baptiste Vermoelen: Premende Coronant.
Frans Ignace de Lams: Mansuete.
Joseph Jacob vander Boven: de sursum.
Jean Chrisosthpme Sammels: Dulciter et Velociter.
Jacob Thomas: Procede Fideliter.
Anthony Vaerendonck: Crescite in Gratia.
Marcell de Vos: Gaute et suaviter.
Guilhem Fracis Rosa: Per Crucem ad Astras.
Auguste Pooters: Lucere et Ardere Protectum. Final Abbot ordained in 1790. Died 1816 in Antwerp.

Burials 
A number of notable people were buried in the church, including:
 Philip I Rubens, brother of Peter Paul Rubens
 Maria Pypelinckx
 Isabella Brant and her parents, Joannes Brant and Claire de Moy
 Abraham Ortelius
 Michiel Cnobbaert

References

External links
A seventeenth-century view of St Michael's Abbey, available on Google Books.

Christian monasteries in Antwerp Province
Premonstratensian monasteries in Belgium
Buildings and structures demolished in 1831
1795 disestablishments in the Southern Netherlands
Demolished buildings and structures in Belgium
Former buildings and structures in Belgium
History of Antwerp